This article contains information about the literary events and publications of 1735.

Events
May 10 – Charles Macklin unintentionally kills another actor, Thomas Hallam, during a fight at Drury Lane Theatre, in front of witnesses; Macklin is later convicted of manslaughter.
August 4 – A jury finds John Peter Zenger not guilty of seditious libel in The New York Weekly Journal.
September 3 – Samuel Johnson marries Elizabeth "Tetty" Porter, twenty years his senior, at St Werburgh's Church, Derby.
Jesuit scholar Jean-Baptiste Du Halde publishes Description Géographique, Historique, Chronologique, Politique et Physique de l'Empire de la Chine et de la Tartarie Chinois in Paris, including Father Joseph Henri Marie de Prémare's translation of The Orphan of Zhao ("L'Orphelin de la Maison de Tchao"; 13th century), the first Chinese play to have been published in any European language.
The Sublime Society of Beef Steaks is established by John Rich at the Theatre Royal, Covent Garden, London, as a dining club mainly for literary men.

New books

Prose
Anonymous (attributed to Eliza Haywood – The Dramatic Historiographer
John Atkins – A Voyage to Guinea, Brazil, and the West Indies
George Berkeley – The Querist
Jane Brereton – Merlin
Henry Brooke – Universal Beauty
Robert Dodsley – Beauty
Jean-Baptiste Du Halde – Geographical, Historical, Chronological, Political, and Physical Description of the Empire of China and Chinese Tartary
Benjamin Hoadly – A Plain Account of the Nature and End of the Sacrament of the Lord's-Supper
Hildebrand Jacob – Works
Samuel Johnson – A Voyage to Abyssinia
Carl Linnaeus – Systema Naturae
George Lyttelton, 1st Baron Lyttelton – Letters from a Persian in England
Benoît de Maillet – Description de l'Egypte
William Melmoth – Of Active and Retired Life
John Oldmixon – The History of England, during the Reigns of William and Mary, Anne, George I
Alexander Pope 
An Epistle from Mr. Pope to Dr. Arbuthnot (just after Arbuthnot's death)
Of the Characters of Women (Moral Epistle II)
The Works of Mr. Alexander Pope
Letters of Mr. Pope, and Several Eminent Persons (a piracy by Edmund Curll, with forgeries included)
Mr. Pope's Literary Correspondence for Thirty Years, 1704 to 1734 (authorized)
Antoine François Prévost – Le Doyen de Killerine
Samuel Richardson – A Seasonable Examination of the Pleas and Pretensions of the Proprietors of, and Subscribers to, Play-Houses
Henry St John, 1st Viscount Bolingbroke – A Dissertation upon Parties
William Somervile – The Chace
Jonathan Swift, Pope, Arbuthnot, et al. 
Miscellanies in Prose and Verse: Volume the Fifth
Works
Claudine Guérin de Tencin – Mémoires du comte de Comminge (Memoirs of the Count of Comminge)
Diego de Torres Villarroel – Conquista del reino de Nápoles por su rey don Carlos de Borbón

Drama
Anonymous – Squire Bassinghall
Henry Carey – The Honest Yorkshireman
Charlotte Charke – The Art of Management
Charles Coffey – The Merry Cobbler
Robert Dodsley – The Toyshop
Robert Fabian – Trick for Trick
Henry Fielding
An Old Man Taught Wisdom
The Universal Gallant
Aaron Hill (adapted from Voltaire) – Zara
George Lillo – The Christian Hero
James Miller – The Man of Taste
William Popple – The Double Deceit
James Worsdale – A Cure for a Scold (a farcical ballad opera adaptation of John Lacy's Sauny the Scot, itself an adaptation of The Taming of the Shrew)

Poetry

John Hughes – Poems on several occasions : With some select essays in prose
Hildebrand Jacob – Brutus the Trojan
Richard Savage – The Progress of a Divine
James Thomson 
Ancient and Modern Italy Compared
Greece
Rome

Births
January 31 – Jean de Crèvecoeur, French-American writer (died 1813) 
May 23 – Charles Joseph, Prince de Ligne, Netherland soldier and writer (died 1814)
July 5 – August Ludwig von Schlözer, German historian (died 1809)
October 25 – James Beattie, Scottish poet and moralist (died 1803)
Unknown date – Anna Hammar-Rosén, Swedish newspaper editor (died 1805)

Deaths
February 27 – John Arbuthnot, British satirist and polymath (born 1667)
April 23 – Edward Hawarden, English controversialist and theologian (born 1662)
April 25 – Samuel Wesley, English clergyman and poet (born 1662)
June 10 – Thomas Hearne, English antiquary and diarist (born 1678)
July 16 – Cassandra Willoughby, Duchess of Chandos, English historian and travel writer (born 1670)

References

 
Years of the 18th century in literature